The men's 800 metres event at the 1936 Summer Olympic Games took place between August 2 and August 4. Forty-two athletes from 23 nations competed. The maximum number of athletes per nation had been set at 3 since the 1930 Olympic Congress. The final was won by American John Woodruff. 

Woodruff's win broke a streak of four British victories in the 800 metres and started a streak of four American victories. (Great Britain missed the podium entirely.) It was the United States' first title in the event since 1912, and fourth overall. Mario Lanzi's silver was Italy's second medal in the event, after another silver in 1908. Phil Edwards repeated his bronze performance from 1932, becoming the third man to win a second medal in the 800 metres.

Summary
With all runners starting from a crouch position, in the middle of the straightaway, the only returning medalist from 1932, Phil Edwards rushed to the lead.  Down the backstretch he was joined by John Woodruff.  For the second day in a row, the Nazi home crowd was seeing two black North Americans leading a final after Jesse Owens and Ralph Metcalfe winning the 100 metres.  Along the home stretch, Kazimierz Kucharski came along the outside, with Brian MacCabe in tow, effectively boxing Woodruff on the rail.  Sensing the danger, Woodruff slowed, dropping to sixth place but giving himself free running room.  With a long relaxed stride, the tall Woodruff ran around the outside and past Edwards into the lead.  Heading into the final turn, Edwards again accelerated into the lead, but Woodruff stayed with him as both separated from Kucharski and Chuck Hornbostel.  With the trailers struggling, a path down the rail opened up for Mario Lanzi to run past them on the inside.  Through the turn, Edwards was unable to break Woodruff.  Coming off the turn, it was Woodruff's long stride that took the advantage over the smaller Edwards.  Now it was Edwards who was struggling as Woodruff pulled away with only half the straightaway to the finish.  Lanzi seized the opportunity to run past Edwards on the outside, but there was no time to run after Woodruff.

Background

This was the 10th appearance of the event, which is one of 12 athletics events to have been held at every Summer Olympics. Three finalists from 1932 returned: bronze medalist Phil Edwards of Canada (who was also the fourth-place finisher in 1928), sixth-place finisher Chuck Hornbostel of the United States, and seventh-place finisher Jack Powell of Great Britain. Along with Edwards, Rudolf Harbig of Germany and John Woodruff of the United States were the favorites.

Peru and Yugoslavia appeared in the event for the first time. Great Britain and the United States each made their ninth appearance, tied for the most among all nations.

Competition format

There were again enough competitors to return to the three-round format introduced in 1912 (after a two-round version in 1932). There were six first-round heats, each with between 6 and 8 athletes; the top four runners in each heat advanced to the semifinals. There were three semifinals with 8 athletes each; the top three runners in each semifinal advanced to the nine-man final.

Records

These were the standing world and Olympic records (in minutes) prior to the 1936 Summer Olympics.

No world or Olympic records were set during the competition.

Schedule

Results

Round 1

The fastest four runners in each of the six heats advanced to the semifinal round.

Heat 1

Heat 2

Heat 3

Heat 4

Heat 5

Heat 6

Semifinals

The fastest three runners in each of the three heats advanced to the final round.

Semifinal 1

Semifinal 2

Semifinal 3

Final

References

Athletics at the 1936 Summer Olympics
800 metres at the Olympics
Men's events at the 1936 Summer Olympics